The Education Bureau (EDB) is responsible for formulating and implementing education policies in Hong Kong.

The bureau is headed by the Secretary for Education and oversees agencies including University Grants Committee and Student Finance Office.

History

The Education Department ( and  before 1983) was responsible for education matters in the territory, with the exception of post-secondary and tertiary education. In 2003, the department was abolished and a new bureau, the Education and Manpower Bureau ( abbreviated EMB) was formed. In July 2007, under newly re-elected Chief Executive Donald Tsang, the manpower portfolio was split away to the new Labour and Welfare Bureau, leaving this body as the Education Bureau.

The bureau was formerly housed at the Former French Mission Building.

Structure
The bureau mainly consists of seven branches, which are responsible for different policies. Each branch is led by a Deputy Secretary for Education.
Further & Higher Education Branch
Planning, Infrastructure and School Places Allocation Branch
Professional Development & Special Education Branch
School Development & Administration Branch
Curriculum and Quality Assurance Branch
Corporate Services Branch
Special Duties

The bureau also oversees two child agencies: the University Grants Committee Secretariat and the Working Family and Student Financial Assistance Agency.

Education system 
The Education System includes: Kindergarten Education, Primary and Secondary School Education, Special Education, Post-secondary Education, and other Education and Training.

Controversies

Censorship of textbooks 
In August 2020, the Education Bureau, with the aim to "help student develop positive values", made changes to the Liberal Studies textbooks of the six main publishers, who were invited to join the voluntary consultancy service introduced by the bureau in the previous year. The pro-democracy Professional Teachers' Union (PTU) said some teachers received messages from the publishers that the amendments relating to criticizing the mainland Chinese government and some political cartoons were replaced with emphasizing the possible criminal consequences for participants. The union accused that it is practising 'political censorship and "had severely damaged the goals" of setting up the project.

On 5 October 2020, the Education Bureau deregistered a primary school teacher, the teacher was accused of using pro-independence materials, which the Bureau claims is an act of "spreading Hong Kong Independence message". The Professional Teachers Union strongly condemned the teacher's disqualification. In a statement, the Hong Kong Professional Teachers' Union accused the education bureau of failing to conduct a fair investigation. It said the unilateral disqualification and issuing of warning letters to the school were "despicable acts of intimidation of the school management" and were unacceptable.

National Security Education 
In February 2021, the Education Bureau, under Kevin Yeung, announced changes to the education system to incorporate the National Security Law. Notices to teachers explained that teachers should educate students as young as 6 years old about the national security law. In response, Ip Kin-yuen, the vice-president of the Professional Teachers' Union, said that he was astounded to see the "vast scope" of the new rules as well as the lack of consultation with teachers before the rules were published.

Later in February 2021, the Education Bureau released a 1,200-word guideline for implementation of the changes, claiming it was "obliged to clarify" so-called misunderstandings by the media when it had announced changes earlier in the month. Ip Kin-yuen responded and said that the guidelines would do little, and that the Education Bureau "should also hold proper consultation sessions among educators and members of the public to explain about the guidelines in detail, listen to their thoughts and opinions, as well as respond to questions and even defend it for themselves if they want".

In March 2021, the government announced that the Education Bureau would begin distributing books to all primary and secondary schools in Hong Kong, meant to cover topics such as national identity and the national security law.

In July 2022, Education Bureau chief Christine Choi Yuk-lin said that national education is not "brainwashing". Choi also said that Hong Kong students must learn about the history of China's socialist system, and must understand why it is suitable for China. Choi later said that students must learn from Xi Jinping's speech on Hong Kong, and that the Education Bureau would hold sessions with school principals and teachers on the speech. Choi also said that if students show that they want China to do well during flag-raising ceremonies or study tours, then it would meet the target of effective national education. In contrast, Priscilla Leung argued and said about the study tours that "In fact, many students have come back from these visits [saying] they don't believe in what they saw, [they claimed] everything was staged."

In September 2022, the Bureau released the updated Primary Education Curriculum Guide, which suggested between 19-25% of the student's lesson time should be devoted to national education and national security education.

In October 2022, the Education Bureau revealed the "Citizenship, Economics and Society" curriculum, designed for students to focus on national identity, the national constitution, and the Basic Law. Other countries'  use of democracy and political systems were also removed from the curriculum.

On 24 October 2022, the Education Bureau confirmed that new teachers in public and direct subsidy scheme schools would be required to take a test on national security and the Basic Law, including kindergarten teachers.

In December 2022, the Education Bureau released an inspection report, saying that many schools had failed in teaching national security.

Universities 
In July 2022, the University of Hong Kong began requiring students to take a course on the national security law in order to graduate. Students must watch 10 hours of videos and pass an online test in order to complete the mandatory security class.

Other universities, including Chinese University of Hong Kong, Hong Kong University of Science and Technology, and the Hong Kong Polytechnic University also began offering courses on national security. The course is listed as a graduation requirement.

Education Bureau chief Christine Choi also said that university student unions were "instigating the anti-China sentiment and hatred toward the Chinese people" during the 2019 Hong Kong protests.

In December 2022, the Education Bureau said that all universities must require students to take courses on national education, stating "Education on the [Chinese] constitution, the Basic Law and the national security law should also form an important part of the university curriculum, with a view to nurturing students into law-abiding and responsible citizens."

Study tour 
In March 2021, the Education Bureau revealed that new teachers in Hong Kong would have to travel to mainland China to undergo mandatory training.

In July 2022, the Education Bureau asked secondary schools to create plans for taking students on mainland China study tours.

Liberal studies 
In April 2021, a survey by PORI found that more than 60% of Hong Kongers opposed changes to the Liberal Studies course, changes implemented by the Education Bureau after the course came under attack from pro-Beijing figures who claimed the course was used to encourage students to take part in the 2019-20 Hong Kong protests.

In January 2023, trips to mainland China became mandatory for 50,000 Secondary Five students as part of the Liberal Studies course.

National flag ceremonies 
In October 2021, the Education Bureau revealed new guidelines for implementing national flag ceremonies in schools, stating that it would "promote national education and help students develop a sense of belonging to the country, an affection for the Chinese people and enhance their sense of national identity."

Under the ordinance, Hong Kong's universities, secondary schools and primary schools are required to hold weekly flag-hoisting ceremonies.

In October 2022, after St. Francis Xavier's School suspended 3 students, the Education Bureau was criticized for not providing guidelines on punishment if national flag ceremony rules were broken.

Putonghua 
In July 2022, Education Bureau chief Christine Choi said that the city would soon push students to use Putonghua rather than the local language, Cantonese. Choi said that in the future, all classes should be delivered in Putonghua.

British Hong Kong 
In August 2022, the Education Bureau claimed that Hong Kong was never a British colony, and that the British did not have sovereignty over Hong Kong.

Music video 
In September 2022, the Education Bureau encouraged schools to broadcast a patriotic music video called "On the Young China" and urged teachers, students, and parents to "appreciate" it.

Teacher conduct 
In December 2022, the Education Bureau released a set of guidelines on conduct for teachers, which listed protecting national security, social order, and public interest as a priority. In addition, the guidelines stipulated that teachers should promote national education with a correct understanding of the national security law.

English 
In 1998, schools had to adapt to "biliteracy and trilingualism." Pre-1997, 90% of secondary schools taught most subjects in English, and by 2019, only 30% used English.

Principals 
In March 2023, the Education Bureau said that principals must have a "sense of national identity."

See also
Education in Hong Kong
Government of Hong Kong
Hong Kong Examinations and Assessment Authority
List of Hong Kong government agencies
School-Based Management Policy
Mother-Tongue teaching in Hong Kong

References

External links
 Official website 
Organisation chart of Hong Kong Government

Education in Hong Kong
Hong Kong
Hong Kong government policy bureaux
Ministries established in 1852
1852 establishments in the British Empire